Chinta Anuradha is an Indian politician and a member of parliament from Amalapuram Lok Sabha constituency, Andhra Pradesh. She is also parliament coordinator for the YSR Congress Party (YSRCP).

Campaign 
As a candidate for YSRCP, Anuradha ran to be a member of the 17th Lok Sabha. On 16 March 2019, she officially received her party's nomination.

In April 2019, rumours began to spread that she had dropped out of the race. Anuradha denied this and accused members of Jana Sena and the Telugu Desam Party of spreading misinformation against her.

Personal life 
Anuradha was the daughter of Chinta Krishnamurthy. She was raised in Maruteru Village within the West Godavari district of Andhra Pradesh, India.

In 1991, she married her current spouse Shri Talla Satyanarayana. They have two daughters and one son.

References 

Living people
India MPs 2019–present
Lok Sabha members from Andhra Pradesh
YSR Congress Party politicians
Women members of the Lok Sabha
Indian feminists
People from West Godavari district
Women in Andhra Pradesh politics
1972 births
21st-century Indian women politicians